Mun Kyung-gun (born February 9, 1995) is a South Korean football player who plays for Gimcheon Sangmu.

Playing career
Mun joined J2 League club Oita Trinita in 2017. On June 6, 2018, he debuted against Renofa Yamaguchi FC in Emperor's Cup.

Career statistics

Last update: 27 February 2019

References

External links

1995 births
Living people
South Korean footballers
J1 League players
J2 League players
Oita Trinita players
Association football goalkeepers